The Dominican Republic observes Atlantic Standard Time (UTC−4) year-round.

IANA time zone database 
In the IANA time zone database, Dominican Republic is given one zone in the file zone.tab—America/El_Salvador. "SV" refers to the country's ISO 3166-1 alpha-2 country code. Data for Dominican Republic directly from zone.tab of the IANA time zone database; columns marked with * are the columns from zone.tab itself:

References

External links 
Current time in Dominican Republic at Time.is
Time in Dominican Republic at TimeAndDate

Time in the Dominican Republic